Inokom Corporation Sdn. Bhd. is a subsidiary of Malaysian-based Sime Darby Motors. Inokom is the licensed contract assembler for Hyundai, BMW and Mazda passenger vehicles in Malaysia.

Inokom was incorporated in October 1992 through a joint venture between companies from Malaysia, France and South Korea. In 1998, Inokom's shareholders included the Berjaya Group (35%), Royal Malaysian Police Cooperative subsidiary Pesumals (30%), Renault (15%), Hyundai Motor Company (15%) and Hyumal Motor (5%).

History
Inokom launched its first product, the Inokom Permas in 1998. The Permas is based on the first generation Renault Traffic, and was produced in various configurations at Inokom's new plant in Kulim, Kedah. In May 2000, Inokom launched its second product, the Inokom Lorimas, a license-built Hyundai Porter. Inokom's first non-commercial product, the Hyundai-based Inokom Atos was launched in 2002.

In 2004, Sime Darby acquired a 51% stake in Inokom, and by the 2010s, Hyundai assembly operations in Malaysia were centralised at the Inokom plant. Prior to the consolidation, Hyundai models were assembled at two separate plants, namely the Inokom plant in Kulim and the Oriental Assemblers plant in Tampoi.

Inokom's acquisition by Sime Darby also led to the assembly of BMW M and Land Rover models at the Inokom plant in 2008. BMW M and Land Rover vehicles were previously assembled at the Associated Motor Industries plant in Shah Alam, which shut down in 2007. Mazda assembly at Inokom commenced in 2011 under a separate initiative by the Berjaya Group. Inokom has also carried out contract assembly for Dongfeng, Jinbei and Ford commercial vehicles.

Presently, Inokom's shareholders include Sime Darby Motors (51%), Sime Darby Hyundai (5%), Hyundai Motor Company (15%) and Bermaz Auto (29%).

Inokom was previously known as Industri Otomotif Komersial (Malaysia) Sdn. Bhd. between 1992 and 2002. The company changed its name to Inokom Corporation Sdn. Bhd. in November 2002.

Lineup of Inokom branded vehicles

Former Passenger vehicles
Inokom i10, a version of Hyundai's i10 city car launched on the Malaysian market in August 2008 with a 1.1 litre Epsilon engine. Produced by Inokom in their Kulim, Kedah plant.
Inokom Santa Fe, launched in Malaysia in August 2007. A version of Hyundai's Santa Fe with a choice of 2.2 litre Diesel engine or 2.7 litre petrol engines.
Inokom Atos Prima, introduced May 2005 as a facelift on an earlier generation Hyundai Atos with a frontal redesign similar to Hyundai's Atos Prime.
Inokom Getz, available as a 3 or 5 door hatchback with 1.4 litre engine mated to a manual or automatic transmission. This is a version of the 2006 facelifted Hyundai Getz.
Inokom Matrix, locally produced since Sept 2004, this is a version of the pre 2009 facelift Hyundai Lavita family car.

Former Commercial vehicles

Inokom Lorimas, a version of the Hyundai Porter launched in 2002, produced for the local market and also for export. Exported to Chile from 2004 and to the Philippines from 2007.
Hyundai HD5000, a larger and more modern light duty truck, launched in March 2007.
Inokom Permas, a version of the Renault Trafic as introduced in the early eighties.

Contract assembly

BMW

Current models (2021)

Discontinued models (2021)

MINI

Current models (2021)

Mazda

Current models (2021)

Discontinued models (2021)

Hyundai

Current models (2021)

Discontinued models (2021)

Kia

Current models (2022)

Porsche

Current models (2022)

Ford

Discontinued models (2014-2016)

References

External links 
 Inokom Corporation Sdn. Bhd.

1992 establishments in Malaysia
Car manufacturers of Malaysia
Truck manufacturers of Malaysia
Hyundai Motor Company
Malaysian brands
Privately held companies of Malaysia
Contract vehicle manufacturers